The 5th Kansas Infantry Regiment was an infantry regiment that served in the Union Army during the American Civil War.

Service
Two companies of the 5th Kansas Infantry were organized at Fort Scott, Kansas.

The regiment was attached to Lane's Kansas Brigade.

The 5th Kansas Infantry ceased to exist due to a lack of recruits. Members of the two companies were consolidated with recruits from the 3rd Kansas Infantry and 4th Kansas Infantry (both of which failed to complete organization) to form the 10th Kansas Infantry.

Detailed service
Operations about Fort Scott September and October 1861. Action at Morristown September 17. Osceola September 21–22.

References
 Dyer, Frederick H. A Compendium of the War of the Rebellion (Des Moines, IA: Dyer Pub. Co.), 1908.
Attribution

See also

 List of Kansas Civil War Units
 Kansas in the Civil War

Military units and formations established in 1861
Military units and formations disestablished in 1861
Units and formations of the Union Army from Kansas
1861 establishments in Kansas